Malik Ikhtiyar-ud-din Altunia was the governor of Bhatinda (Punjab) in India under the rule of the Delhi Sultanate under the Mamluk dynasty. He was the husband of Razia Sultana.

Early life 

Mirza Altunia born was some time around 1202-04 CE in Bhatinda, Punjab.

He was given the charge of sharab-dar (office the care of the liquors) and after sometime when Sultan Itutmish saw the bravery and manliness in him he gave him the office of Sar Chatar-dar (head of the state canopy-bearers). During the reign of Razia Sultan, he stood by her like a pillar through thick and thin times. He helped her break the 40 Amirs and strengthen her rule, he also helped her in over throwing the rule of Shah Turkan and her son, Ruknuddin Firoz who were very cruel. Due to his services to her and the Sultanate, she made him the Governor of Bhatinda which was under the rule of the Delhi Sultanate.

Some historians say that, it was because of Malik Altunia's undying support and protective shield towards her, that she managed to rule successfully for four years. This fact made sense because, after he left for Bhatinda the Turkish nobles started to conspire against her and spread rumors about her and Jamal-ud-Din Yaqut, an Abyssinian Siddi (Habshi) slave, and she began to meet her downfall.

Love for Razia Sultan 

Altunia and Razia were childhood friends, some claim them to be childhood sweethearts. He had aimed to be her royal consort one day, but Razia's busy life and heavy responsibility as a Sultan wasn't something that she could overlook. Hence she kept turning down his repeated proposals for marriage. When he became the governor of Bhatinda, Razia started relying on an Abyssinian Slave named Jamaluddin Yaqut who was loyal to the Sultana. Yaqut in a short span had acquired great position and rank. From a simple Amir-i-Akhur (Lord of the stables), he became Amir-ul-Umra (Chief of the Nobles). The position of Amir-ul-Umra was earlier held only by a Turk of highest order. The growing rumour between the illicit relationship between Yaqut and Razia made him jealous and so he led a rebellion against her .

It is now accepted that Malik Altunia was her first and last love. The rumors of Yaqut were only spread by Turkish nobles to put the Sultana's image down. Many well known historians also believe that the rebellion was simply a way of getting her back and to protect her from the evil eyes of people like Kabir Khan and the Turkish Nobles who always wanted her downfall because they could not accept a woman sitting on the throne. Mount Elphiston describes Malik Altunia in his book as "the safest hands Sultan Razia could ever be placed in."

A battle ensued between the lovers, Yaqut was killed and Razia was captured and taken as prisoner. While in prison, she was kept in royalty and Altunia visited her regularly. She was allowed to go to Hajirattan mosque to offer prayers on Fridays in a special palki. The changing nature and extreme care melted the anger of Razia Sultan and she won him over once again with her love clearing the misunderstandings once and for all. As a result, she was released and the lovers got married.

Death 

Altunia, brought forth Sultan Razia from the fortress of Bhatinda, assembled forces, and marched towards the capital. However, their plan had little chance to get success still they tried. Both Razia and the Mirza were defeated in October 1240. They fled Delhi and reached Kaithal the next day, where their remaining forces abandoned them. They both fell into the hands of Jats and were robbed and killed on the date corresponds to October 13, 1240.

There is a claimed burial site where Razia Sultana was buried in Kaithal and  Altunia was also buried next to her. There was also a masjid nearby.

The Viceroy of India Lord Linlithgow in 1938 came to Kaithal to visit Razia's tomb. He approved a special grant for the restoration of the tomb. After that the Director General of the Archaeology Survey of India visited the tomb but due to the Second World War, the grant could not be spent on the restoration.

In popular culture 
Altunia has been portrayed several times in Indian films (focusing on Razia Sultana), including by Paidi Jairaj in Razia Sultana (1961), Vijayendra Ghatge in Razia Sultan (1983).

In 2015, &TV started airing a TV series on the life of Razia Sultan, starring Rohit Purohit as Malik Altunia which highlighted both, her tough journey towards becoming a Sultan and her much spoken about passionate love life with Altunia.

References

Mamluk dynasty (Delhi)
13th-century Indian Muslims
13th-century Indian people
People from Bathinda
1240 deaths
Kings consort
Indian royal consorts
Spouses of sultans